Daniella Hill (born Daniella Bunch on May 16, 1991) is an American track and field athlete specializing in throwing events.  She is the 2018 United States Indoor Champion in the shot put.

Professional
Dani won the 2018 United States Indoor Championship in shot put. She also competed in 2017 World Outdoor Shot Put and 2018 World Indoor Shot Put.

Hill started as a volunteer coach at Purdue University in 2014 through 2017 and currently serves as a throws assistant coach for men and women throws at Grand Valley State University.

Personal
She married Zack Hill on October 7, 2017. Zack was a former shot putter for Michigan State University.

NCAA
She competed for Purdue University.  At the 2014 NCAA Indoor Championships, she scored all of Purdue's team points between the shot put and weight throw.  Her 10 points were the most the entire team has scored in 14 years.  She was named Big Ten Field Athlete of the Year and Big Ten Field Athlete of the Championships.

Prep
Prior to Purdue, she competed for Mahomet-Seymour High School in Mahomet, Illinois where she won five state championships in the shot put (3 indoors, 2 outdoors).

References

External links
 
 
 
 Daniella Bunch at Athletic.net
 

1991 births
Living people
American female shot putters
Purdue Boilermakers women's track and field athletes
Sportspeople from Lafayette, Indiana
Athletes (track and field) at the 2019 Pan American Games
Pan American Games track and field athletes for the United States
USA Indoor Track and Field Championships winners
People from Champaign County, Illinois
Big Ten Athlete of the Year winners